Ballenas Secondary School, or École Secondaire Ballenas is a well recognized school due to its Whalebone Theatre, which attracts audiences from around the Oceanside area. Aside from offering French Immersion, Ballenas also offers individual French and Spanish language courses for students.

Other programs at Ballenas Secondary include: 
 Music: Students from Grade 8-12 can participate in a number of ensembles such as guitar, choir, and concert band. Fundraising is optional but is quite active within its members.
 Sports teams such as the Ballenas Whalers football, soccer, basketball, and rugby.
 Art

It is situated in the tourist attractive city of Parksville, British Columbia, Canada.

Kwalikum Secondary and Ballenas Secondary are the two public high schools a part of School District 69. Kwalikum Secondary is located in Qualicum Beach, British Columbia.

References

High schools in British Columbia
Parksville, British Columbia
Educational institutions in Canada with year of establishment missing